Two kings of Dál Riata were named Domnall (Donald):

 Domnall Brecc (Donald the Freckled) (died 642)
 Domnall Donn (Donald the Brown) (died c. 685)